María Jiménez may refer to:
 María Jiménez (singer), Spanish singer
 María Jiménez (footballer), Spanish footballer
 María Jiménez del Castillo, Mexican politician